Eurypepla is a genus of tortoise beetles and hispines in the family Chrysomelidae. There are at least four described species in Eurypepla.

Species
These four species belong to the genus Eurypepla:
 Eurypepla brevilineata Boheman, 1854 i c g
 Eurypepla calochroma (Blake, 1965) i c g
 Eurypepla jamaicensis (Linnaeus, 1758) i c g
 Eurypepla vitrea Boheman, 1854 i c g
Data sources: i = ITIS, c = Catalogue of Life, g = GBIF, b = Bugguide.net

References

Further reading

 

Cassidinae